Giannis Sotirhos (born 6 April 1977) is Greek a professional association football defender who plays for Olympiakos Volos F.C. in the Greek Second Division.

External links
Guardian's Stats Centre

1977 births
Living people
Greek footballers
Association football defenders
Paniliakos F.C. players
Levadiakos F.C. players
Atromitos F.C. players
Chalkidona F.C. players
Ionikos F.C. players
Thrasyvoulos F.C. players
Olympiacos Volos F.C. players
People from Boeotia
Footballers from Central Greece